This is a list of libraries in Ankara. The list is divided according to the type libraries.

National libraries
Presidential Library

National Library

Academic libraries

Public libraries
Adnan Ötüken City Public Library
Abdurrrahman Oğultürk Public Library
Akyurt County Public Library.
Ankara Ali Dayi Children's Library
Ankara Kalecik County Public Library
Ankara Public Library OR-The Year of Love
Ayas County Public Library
Bala County Public Library
Balgat Hussein Alpine Public Library
Beypazarı Mehmet Akif Ersoy County Public Library
Cebeci Public Library
Cer Modern Art Library
Çamlıdere County Public Library
Çubuk County Public Library
Elmadağ County Public Library
Universe County Public Library
Fatih Library
Göklerkö Public Library
Gölbaşı County Public Library
Gudul County Public Library
Hasanoğlan April 17 Public Library
Haymana County Public Library
Karas Public Library
Boiler County Public Library
Kecioren Aktepe Public Library
Kecioren Fatih Public Library
Kesikköprü Public Library
Kızılcahamam County Public Library
Kutludüğün Public Library
Mamak County Public Library
Mehmet Akif Ersoy Literature Museum Library
National Library
Nallıhan County Public Library
Oyaca Public Library
Polatli County Public Library
Pursaklar House Public Library
Sinanlı Public Library
Sincan County Public Library
Sincan Yenikent Public Library
Şentepe Public Library
Şereflikoçhisar Yunus Emre County Public Library
Şuayip Çalkan Public Library
Yenimahalle District Public Library
Yunus Emre (Esentepe) Public Library

Municipal libraries
Ankara Metropolitan Municipality District Library

Libraries
Ankara
Ankara-related lists
Ankara